Tony Dantes is a Filipino actor who spent his movie career under LVN Pictures.

Born in 1930, his first movie appearance is El Diablo (The Devil) and Hen. Gregorio del Pilar, a biography of one of the famous Filipino heroes in 1949.

His last film was a Nationalistic movie, Badjao. He portrayed one of the Badjao Tribsmen.

Filmography

 1949 - El Diablo
 1949 - Hen. Gregorio del Pilar
 1952 - Tia Loleng
 1954 - Mabangong Kandungan
 1957 - Walang Sugat
 1957 - Badjao
 1957 - Blessings of the Land

External links

1930 births
Living people
Filipino male film actors